Alfons ("Fons") De Wolf (born 22 June 1956 in Willebroek) is a retired Belgian road race cyclist, a professional from 1979 to 1990. He represented his country at the 1976 Summer Olympics in Montreal, Canada.

He was forecast, with Daniel Willems, to be the successor to Eddy Merckx. De Wolf seemed to fulfill that promise by having an absolutely dominant 1979 Vuelta a España winning 5 stages including an individual time trial as well as the Points Classification, securing a top 10 place in the General Classification and then following it up by winning the 1980 Giro di Lombardia and the 1981 Milan–San Remo, the last and first classic of the season. He almost won the 1982 Liège–Bastogne–Liège, beaten by Italian Silvano Contini in the final sprint.

After winning a stage in the 1984 Tour de France, his career faded, however the stage win he claimed was an impressive individual effort in which he was able to beat the group of favorites including Bernard Hinault and eventual winner Laurent Fignon by a stunning margin of almost eighteen minutes.
He helped his teammate Eddy Planckaert win the green jersey in the 1988 Tour de France. He ended his career in 1990.

He now helps his wife in her funeral parlour in Dworp, in the south of Brussels.

Although he won the Omloop Het Volk two times, De Wolf was an atypical Flemish cyclist, preferring Italian races such as Milan–San Remo to Paris–Roubaix, Gent–Wevelgem and the Tour of Flanders. He was at ease in hilly races, though he was not an impressive climber.

He complained that he was seen as a 'new Eddy Merckx', that the public had expected too much.

Major results

1976
 1st Tour de Namur
 3rd Ronde van Vlaanderen Beloften
 4th Road race, Summer Olympics
1977
 1st Kattekoers
 3rd Ronde van Vlaanderen Beloften
1978
 1st Paris–Roubaix Espoirs
 1st  Road race, National Amateur Road Championships
 2nd Overall GP Tell
 2nd Circuit de Wallonie
 2nd Flèche Ardennaise
 2nd Kattekoers
1979
 1st Omloop Schelde-Durme
 2nd Trofeo Baracchi (with Jan van Houwelingen)
 2nd Leeuwse Pijl
 3rd Overall Tour of Belgium
 3rd Scheldeprijs
 4th Overall Three Days of Bruges–De Panne
 5th La Flèche Wallonne
 7th De Brabantse Pijl
 8th Liège–Bastogne–Liège
 9th Overall Vuelta a España
1st  Points classification
1st Stages 2, 7, 9, 16b & 19
 9th Overall Tirreno–Adriatico
 9th Paris–Roubaix
1980
 1st Druivenkoers Overijse
 1st Giro di Lombardia
 1st Trofeo Baracchi (with Jean-Luc Vandenbroucke)
 2nd Overall Tirreno–Adriatico
 2nd Amstel Gold Race
 2nd Gent–Wevelgem
 2nd Circuit des Frontières
 3rd Rund um den Henninger Turm
 3rd Overall Vuelta a Mallorca
 4th Liège–Bastogne–Liège
 4th GP de Fourmies
 5th Overall Giro di Sardegna
 6th Paris–Roubaix
 6th Grand Prix des Nations
 6th Züri-Metzgete
 7th Omloop Het Volk
 8th Paris–Brussels
 10th Tour of Flanders
 10th Milan–San Remo
1981
 1st Six Days of Antwerp (with René Pijnen)
 1st Milan–San Remo
 1st Circuit des Frontières
 1st Polder–Kempen
 1st Stage 4 Tour of Belgium
 1st Stage 6 Tour de Suisse
 2nd GP Eddy Merckx
 3rd Overall Paris–Nice
 3rd Gent–Wevelgem
 3rd Amstel Gold Race
 3rd E3 Harelbeke
 5th Overall Deutschland Tour
 5th Züri-Metzgete
 6th De Brabantse Pijl
 7th Road race, UCI World Championships
 7th Tour of Flanders
 9th Grand Prix des Nations
 10th Paris–Roubaix
1982
 1st Omloop Het Volk
 1st Sassari–Cagliari
 1st Stage 1a Three Days of Bruges–De Panne
 2nd Grote Prijs Jef Scherens
 2nd Liège–Bastogne–Liège
 3rd Gent–Wevelgem
 3rd Road race, National Road Championships
 3rd Ronde van Limburg
 4th Rund um den Henninger Turm
 8th Overall Four Days of Dunkirk
1st Stage 5a
 10th La Flèche Wallonne
1983
 1st Omloop Het Volk
 1st Coppa Ugo Agostoni
 1st Giro della Romagna
 1st Giro di Toscana
 1st Stage 2 Giro del Trentino
 1st Stage 1 Setmana Catalana de Ciclisme
 5th Overall Giro di Sardegna
 8th Liège–Bastogne–Liège
 9th La Flèche Wallonne
1984
 1st Stage 14 Tour de France
 1st Stage 6 Tour of Norway
 1st Stage 1 Tour de Romandie
 1st Stage 3 Vuelta a Andalucía
 9th GP Eddy Merckx
1985
 1st Stage 9 Vuelta a España
 1st Stage 2 Vuelta Ciclista a la Comunidad Valenciana
1986
 6th Tour of Flanders
 9th De Brabantse Pijl
1988
 2nd Dwars door Vlaanderen
 7th Gent–Wevelgem
1989
 3rd Road race, National Road Championships
1990
 7th Nokere Koerse

References

External links

Official Tour de France results for Alfons De Wolf

1956 births
Living people
Belgian male cyclists
Belgian Tour de France stage winners
Cyclists at the 1976 Summer Olympics
Olympic cyclists of Belgium
Belgian Vuelta a España stage winners
Funeral directors
People from Willebroek
Tour de Suisse stage winners
Cyclists from Antwerp Province
20th-century Belgian people